This list of the oldest banks in India includes financial institutions that were founded in the 18th and 19th centuries. Listed are the thirty oldest banks in India, which includes all financial institutions founded prior to 1850.

The oldest bank in India is The Madras Bank (1683), followed by the Bank of Bombay, founded in 1720, which is then followed by the Bank of Hindustan, founded in 1770.

The oldest bank still in operation is the State Bank of India, whose origins can be traced back to the Bank of Calcutta, was founded in 1806, though the tenth to be founded.

Locations of headquarters 

The below cities are frequently listed among the headquarters of the banks mentioned in the above table.

See also
 History of banking
 Banking in India
 List of oldest companies
 List of oldest companies in India
 Lindy effect

References

External links 
 List maintained by the Reserve Bank of India
 Evolution of Banking in India
 Charles Northcote Cooke
 History of Banking in India

Economy-related lists of superlatives
Lists of banks
History of banking
Banks
Lists of companies of India
Lists of longest-duration things
Banks of India
Financial history of India